They Shoot, We Score is a compilation soundtrack album by the band Yo La Tengo, released on September 5, 2008.

It contains tracks from the films Old Joy (2006), Junebug (2005), Game 6 (2005) and Shortbus (2006).

"Spec Bebop" is a shortened new recording of the track from I Can Hear the Heart Beating as One and "Madeline" is different from the identically titled track from And Then Nothing Turned Itself Inside Out.

The album was released with different covers using the posters for each of the films as a cover.

Track listing
Tracks 1-6: Old Joy
Tracks 7-13: Junebug
Tracks 14-23: Game 6
Tracks 24-27: Shortbus

 "Leaving Home" (2:44)
 "Getting Lost" (3:02)
 "Path to Springs" (1:30)
 "Driving Home" (3:48)
 "Leaving Home (alternate version)" (4:25)
 "Old Joy: End Credits" (2:48)
 "Ashley" (1:37)
 "Meerkats" (0:34)
 "Madeline" (0:39)
 "A Roomful of Ladies" (outtake) (1:57)
 "David Wark" (1:05)
 "Aftermath (outtake)" (2:08)
 "George" (0:40)
 "This Could Be It" (2:49)
 "The Phantom Who Haunts Broadway" (0:42)
 "Game Time" (1:04)
 "Pharaoh Blues" (2:42)
 "Zoo Chant" (2:29)
 "Love Chant" (4:53)
 "Asbestos" (1:05)
 "Return of the Pharaoh" (1:31)
 "Spec Bebop" (3:03)
 "Buckner's Boner" (2:24)
 "Isolation Tank" (2:09)
 "Panic in Central Park (outtake)" (1:10)
 "Panic in Central Park" (1:10)
 "Wizard's Sleeve" (2:05)

Personnel
Georgia Hubley - vocals, drums, keyboards
Ira Kaplan - vocals, guitar, keyboards
James McNew - vocals, bass
 Doug Wieselman - clarinet (Junebug)
 Garo Yellin - cello (Junebug)
 Katie Gentile - violin (Junebug)
 Margaret White - viola (Junebug)
 Amy Kimball - violin (Junebug)
 Dennis Cronin - trumpet (Junebug)
 Smokey Hormel - guitar (Old Joy)
 Sabir Mateen - alto saxophone (Shortbus)

References 

Yo La Tengo albums
2008 soundtrack albums
2008 compilation albums
Soundtrack compilation albums